Hertzfeld, Hertzfeldt are surnames of:
 Andy Hertzfeld (born 1953), a key member of the original Apple Macintosh development team
 Don Hertzfeldt
 Estella Hertzfeld (1837–1881), Dutch poet

See also 
 Herzfeld

German-language surnames
Jewish surnames